Datuk Yahya bin Sulong (1928 - 6 February 2013), also known as Pak Ya, was a Malaysian comedian and actor, appearing in 24 films and several television sitcoms.

Career
Sulong made his film debut in Abu Nawas and subsequently appeared in 23 other films, notably those in the 1980s, including Da Di Du, Putus Sudah Kasih Sayang, Toyol and Prebet Lapok.

Personal life
Sulong was married to Datin Alisah Ali; prior to their marriage, he had married three other times.

Death
After reportedly suffering from asthma and heart disease prior to his death, Yahya died on 6 February 2013 at the Hospital Kuala Lumpur at 6.45 p.m. local time. He was subsequently buried in Teluk Intan, Perak.

Filmography

Film
Abu Nawas (1961 - First film debut)
Ahmad Albab (1968)
Durjana (1971)
Putus Sudah Kasih Sayang (1971)
Gila-Gila (1979)
Prebet Lapok (1979)
Da Di Du (1981)
Toyol (1981)
Si Luncai (1981)
Serampang Tiga (1981)
Penyamun Tarbus (1981)
Manis-Manis Sayang (1983)
Anak Niat (1984)
Talak (1984)
Oh Fatimah (1989)
Janda Meletup (1990)
Senario the Movie (1999)

Television
 Hang Setia
 Si Jantung Hati

Bangsawan
Laila Majnun 
Batu Belah Batu Bertangkup

References

External links
 

1928 births
2013 deaths
20th-century Malaysian male actors
Malaysian comedians
Malaysian male television actors
People from Kuala Lumpur